Emthanjeni Local Municipality is a local municipality in the Pixley ka Seme District Municipality district of the Northern Cape province of South Africa. Emthanjeni is a Xhosa name meaning a "vein", symbolising the importance of an underground water supply system to the area. It is also a translation of the name of the municipality's seat, De Aar.

Main places
The 2011 census divided the municipality into the following main places:

Politics

The municipal council consists of fifteen members elected by mixed-member proportional representation. Eight councillors are elected by first-past-the-post voting in eight wards, while the remaining seven are chosen from party lists so that the total number of party representatives is proportional to the number of votes received. In the election of 1 November 2021 the African National Congress (ANC) won a majority of nine seats on the council.

The following table shows the results of the election.

References

External links
 Official website

Local municipalities of the Pixley ka Seme District Municipality